Cooper's Rock State Forest Superintendent's House and Garage is a historic home and garage located at Cooper's Rock State Forest near Morgantown, Monongalia County, West Virginia. The house was built between 1938 and 1940, and is a two-story, symmetrical log building, measuring 35 feet by 43 feet. Also on the property is a contributing garage also of log construction. Both buildings were built by the Civilian Conservation Corps, CCC camp number 3527, Camp Rhododendron.

It was listed on the National Register of Historic Places in 1991. The Superintendent's House was heavily damaged by a fire on April 7, 2017.

References

Houses in Monongalia County, West Virginia
Civilian Conservation Corps in West Virginia
Houses completed in 1938
Houses completed in 1940
Houses on the National Register of Historic Places in West Virginia
Morgantown, West Virginia
National Register of Historic Places in Monongalia County, West Virginia
Rustic architecture in West Virginia